Eta Piscis Austrini (η Piscis Austrini) is binary star system in the southern constellation of Piscis Austrinus. As of 2000, the two components had an angular separation of 1.818 arc seconds along a position angle of 113.4°. The pair have a combined apparent visual magnitude of +5.43, which is bright enough to be seen with the naked eye. Based upon an annual parallax shift of 3.99 mas as seen from the Earth, the system is located roughly 820 light years from the Sun.

The magnitude 5.7 primary, component A, is a blue-white hued Be star with a stellar classification B8 V. At the age of 115, the star is spinning rapidly with a projected rotational velocity of 265. It has an estimated four times the mass of the Sun and is radiating 604 times the solar luminosity at an effective temperature of 11,272 K. The secondary, component B, has a visual magnitude of 6.8.

Eta Piscis Austrini is moving through the Galaxy at a speed of 11.3 km/s relative to the Sun. Its projected Galactic orbit carries it between 23,600 and 30,800 light years from the center of the Galaxy.

References

A-type main-sequence stars
Binary stars
Piscis Austrini, Eta
Piscis Austrinus
Durchmusterung objects
Piscis Austrini, 12
209014
108661
8386